London Saxophonic is a saxophone ensemble (with piano, bass guitar, and percussion) begun by Gareth Brady, Will Gregory and Simon Haram, while they were studying at the Guildhall School of Music and Drama.  They made their debut in 1994 on Atlantic Records with Sax Pax for a Sax, a collaboration with Moondog, who composed all of the works on the album.  In 1998, they  went to the now-defunct label Tring (primarily a budget-label of technically primitive, cheaply recorded classical music)  with a Michael Nyman retrospective titled An Eye for a Difference, produced by David Roach.

Membership
Tim Redpath - sopranino saxophone, soprano saxophone
Simon Haram - sopranino saxophone, soprano saxophone, alto saxophone, electric wind instrument
Rob Buckland - soprano saxophone, alto saxophone
Christian Forshaw - sopranino saxophone, soprano saxophone, alto saxophone
Andy Findon - bass saxophone, piccolo
Elizabeth Burley - piano
Martin Elliott - bass guitar
Chris Caldwell - baritone saxophone
Will Gregory - alto saxophone, baritone
Gareth Brady - tenor saxophone
Andy Scott - tenor saxophone
David Roach - soprano saxophone, alto saxophone, tenor saxophone
Bernd Kowalzik
Bradley Grant
Peter Hammill
John Rebbeck
Stuart Gordon
Graham Cole
Paul Clarvis
Mike Brogan
Andrew Davis
Danny Thompson
Alun Thomas
Nicola Meecham

References

Musical groups from London